Hammond Park Secondary College is an independent public co-educational  high day school, located in the Perth suburb of Hammond Park, Western Australia.

Overview
Hammond Park Secondary College opened to Year 7 students in 2020. It is situated in Perth's growing suburb of Hammond Park. The first stage of the school had a student capacity of 725, and was built at a cost of $53.75 million. The second stage, which is scheduled to open in 2023 has a planned capacity of 1,450 students between Years 7 and 12, and a cost of $16.79 million. The school was built as part of the "WA Schools Public Private Partnership Project", in which a private corporation designs, builds, finances and maintains eight schools in Perth, under contract from the Western Australian government.

Local intake area
Hammond Park Secondary College's local intake area covers Aubin Grove, Banjup (south of Gibbs Road), Hammond Park, Henderson (south of Cockburn Road), Mandogalup, Wattleup and Wandi. Students living in the local intake area have a guaranteed place at the school if they apply.

Student numbers

See also

 List of schools in the Perth metropolitan area

References

Public high schools in Perth, Western Australia
Educational institutions established in 2020
2020 establishments in Australia